The Homeland Movement (abbr. DP), previously known as Miroslav Škoro Homeland Movement (abbr. DPMŠ) until February 2021, is a nationalist and right-wing populist political party in Croatia. The DP was founded by Croatian singer, former Croatian Democratic Union MP, and 2019–20 presidential election, Miroslav Škoro, on 29 February 2020.

The DP is variously considered conservative, populist and nationalist. The party competed in the 2020 Croatian parliamentary election in a coalition with several other minor right-wing to far-right parties, including the Croatian Conservative Party, Croatian Growth and Bloc for Croatia.

History 
On 29 February 2020, Miroslav Škoro, a former MP who stood in the recent presidential election, confirmed to the media the formation of a new party, four and a half months before the parliamentary elections. The DP tried to form a broad right-of-centre coalition for the upcoming election. They negotiated with the Bridge of Independent Lists, but no agreement was reached. A coalition was formed with several other parties, including the conservative Croatian Sovereignists coalition, which was established to contest the 2019 European elections, and the newly founded Bloc for Croatia. A coalition agreement was also signed with the Green list, emphasizing "environmental protection and the fight against climate change".

On 20 July 2021, Miroslav Škoro resigned as party president over a dispute over party finances. This was soon followed by disciplinary proceedings against Škoro and his sister Vesna Vučemilović, which is why they decided to leave the party.

Election results

Legislative

References

2020 establishments in Croatia
Conservative parties in Croatia
Croatian nationalist parties
Eurosceptic parties in Croatia
Nationalist parties in Croatia
Far-right politics in Croatia
Political parties established in 2020
Right-wing populist parties
Social conservative parties